The Beriev A-50 (NATO reporting name: Mainstay) is a Soviet airborne early warning and control (AEW&C) aircraft based on the Ilyushin Il-76 transport. Developed to replace the Tupolev Tu-126 "Moss", the A-50 first flew in 1978. Its existence was revealed to the Western Bloc in 1980 by Adolf Tolkachev. It entered service in 1985, with about 40 produced by 1992.

Design and development

The A-50 can control up to ten fighter aircraft for either air-to-air intercept or air-to-ground attack missions. The aircraft can be refuelled by Il-78 tankers.

The radar "Vega-M" is designed by MNIIP, Moscow, and produced by NPO Vega. The "Vega-M" can track up to 150 targets simultaneously within .

Development work on a modernized version, the A-50U, began in 2003; state tests started on 10 September 2008, using a Russian Air Force A-50 "37 Krasnyy" as a prototype. It replaces analog avionics with a new digital avionics suite, made by Vega Radio Engineering Corporation, that speeds data processing and improves signal tracking and target detection. Crew rest, toilet and galley facilities are also included in the upgrade.

After completing the joint state tests, Beriev has delivered the first A-50U to the Russian Air Force. The aircraft, "47 Krasnyy'"RF-92957, was handed over at Beriev's facility in Taganrog on 31 October 2011. It was accepted by an aircrew serving with the 2457th Aviation Base for Combat Operation of Airborne Early Warning Aircraft (Aviabaza Boevogo Primeneniya Samolyotov Dal'nego Radiolokatsionnogo Obnaruzheniya) at Ivanovo Severny, which is the only base using the A-50 operationally (it operates 16 aircraft). The fourth A-50U, "41 Taganrog", was delivered to the Russian Aerospace Forces on 7 March 2017. The fifth A-50U, "45 Krasnyy", was delivered on 6 December 2018. 7 aircraft have been delivered as of December 2021.

The A-50U upgrade forms the basis of the concept for Beriev A-100 AEW&C. Its configuration will be similar, but with a new Vega Premier active electronically scanned array radar.

Operational history
In late December 2015, the A-50 started operations over Syria, flying from Russia, to support Russian military intervention in the Syrian Civil War. 

In December 2018, it was deployed to Crimea.

On 26 February 2023, during the Russian invasion of Ukraine, a Russian A-50 was reportedly damaged by explosions while stationary at the Machulishchy air base near Minsk, Belarus. Belarusian partisans have claimed to have attacked the plane using drone-dropped munitions. Russia is believed to have nine operational A-50s. The attacked base also hosts MiG-31 fighters used to attack Ukraine. However, satellite imagery of the Machulishchy air base from 28 February showed no significant damage to the sole A-50 located there. The drone operators posted a video of a practice run of the alleged A50U bombing on Youtube on March 2, 2023, which shows the drone landing on the rotodome of the A-50U at Machulishchy. A-50U Drone Attack Practice Run. On March 3, 2023, the drone operators posted a second video showing a drone landing on the domed area on top of the fuselage just forward of the wings followed by a loss of video signal claimed to be due to the actual explosion.Drone Attack Video

Variants

 A-50 – Original variant.
 A-50M – Updated variant of the A-50 fitted with mid-air refueling capability.
 A-50U – Updated variant of the A-50M with modern electronics and increased crew comfort.
 Izdeliye-676 – One-off stop-gap telemetry and tracking aircraft.
 Izdeliye-776 – One-off stop-gap telemetry and tracking aircraft.
 Izdeliye-976 (SKIP) – (Airborne Check-Measure-and-Control Center) – Il-76-based Range Control and Missile tracking platform. Initially built to support Raduga Kh-55 cruise missile tests.
 Izdeliye-1076 – One-off special mission aircraft with unknown duties.
 A-50EI – An export version for the Indian Air Force with Aviadvigatel PS-90A-76 engines and Israeli EL/W-2090 radar.

Operators
 
 Indian Air Force (2 on order) 
 No. 50 Squadron IAF

 
 Russian Air Force
 2457th Aviation Base 
 144th Airborne Early Warning Aviation Regiment

Former operators

 Soviet Air Forces
 Soviet Anti-Air Defence

Specifications (A-50)

See also

References

Further reading
 Yefim Gordon, Dmitriy Kommisarov: Flight Craft 6: Il'yushin/Beriyev A-50. Pen & Sword Books Ltd, 2015, 
Yefim Gordon, Dmitriy Komissarov, Sergey Komissarov:  OBB Ilyushin: A History of the Design Bureau and Its Aircraft

External links

 vectorsite.net Beriev A-50
 Spyflight.co.uk – Beriev A-50 Mainstay
 Aviation.ru A-50
 Red-stars.org – A-50 Mainstay
 Source article of NVO (in Russian)
 Iranian AEW (in Persian)

AWACS aircraft
A-50
1980s Soviet command and control aircraft
Quadjets
High-wing aircraft
T-tail aircraft
Aircraft first flown in 1978